The Technical College System of Georgia (TCSG), formerly known as the Department of Technical and Adult Education (DTAE), is the State of Georgia  Government Agency which supervises the U.S. state of Georgia's 22 technical colleges, while also surveying the adult literacy program and economic and workforce development programs. The system operates the Georgia Virtual Technical Connection, a clearinghouse for online technical courses. The TCSG serves the people and the state by creating a system of technical education whose purpose is to use the latest technology and easy access for all adult Georgians and corporate citizens.

The Technical College System and the University System of Georgia (USG) are completely separate agencies and work entirely independently of each other, except for certain cooperative efforts. Some core courses are transferable between the two, though this was made more difficult when the USG moved to the semester system in 1997, while the TCSG remained on the quarter system. The TCSG changed to the semester system in Fall (August) 2011. The TCSG worked with the state budget office to minimize the economic impact of the conversion, believing a move is in the best interests of TCSG students.

Beginning in 2008, it was being studied whether some schools should merge. The first was the merger of Georgia Aviation Technical College in Eastman into the USG's Middle Georgia College (now known as Middle Georgia State University) in 2007, effective July 1. In September 2008, the State Board of Technical and Adult Education voted to merge 13 colleges into six. The board stated that the mergers only affect the administrative functions of the colleges.

When the University System of Georgia mandated semesters in 1998, enrollment fell by several thousand students, and those that remained took fewer courses, causing budget shortfalls which the state legislature had to make up for.

List of technical colleges

Former units of the TCSG
These institutions were independent units of the TCSG; however, they were merged with other institutions, with most of the mergers occurring during the Technical College System consolidation of 2009.

 Altamaha Technical College, Jesup: merged with Okefenokee Technical College and renamed Coastal Pines Technical College in July 2014.
 Appalachian Technical College, Jasper and Woodstock: merged with Chattahoochee Technical College in July 2009.
 East Central Technical College, Fitzgerald and Ocilla: merged with Valdosta Technical College and renamed Wiregrass Georgia Technical College in July 2010.
 Flint River Technical College, Thomaston: merged with Griffin Technical College and renamed Southern Crescent Technical College in July 2010.
 Georgia Aviation Technical College, Eastman: merged into Middle Georgia State University (then Middle Georgia College) as its aviation campus in July 2007.
 Heart of Georgia Technical College, Dublin: merged with Sandersville Technical College and renamed Oconee Fall Line Technical College in July 2011.
 Middle Georgia Technical College, Warner Robins: merged with Central Georgia Technical College in July 2013.
 Moultrie Technical College, Moultrie: merged with Southwest Georgia Technical College and renamed Southern Regional Technical College in July 2016.
 North Metro Technical College, Acworth: merged with Chattahoochee Technical College in July 2009.
 Northwestern Technical College, Rock Spring: merged with Coosa Valley Technical College and renamed Georgia Northwestern Technical College in July 2009.
 Swainsboro Technical College, Swainsboro: merged with Southeastern Technical College in July 2009.
 West Central Technical College, Waco: merged with West Georgia Technical College (the Waco campus is designated as main campus of the merged schools) in July 2009.

References

External links

Map of the Service Areas of TCSG institutions (including Primary Campus locations)

Former and Inactive Campaigns 
[TCSGSemester411(.com) - Information regarding the TCSG's quarter to semester conversion (no longer active)]

 
Technological universities in the United States
 
NJCAA athletics